Dmitry Nakonechny (born 1991) is a Russian orienteering competitor and junior world champion.

He won a gold medal in the middle distance at the 2011 Junior World Orienteering Championships. He competed at the 2012 World Orienteering Championships. In the sprint competition he qualified for the final, where he placed 38th.

References

External links

1991 births
Living people
Russian orienteers
Male orienteers
Foot orienteers
Junior World Orienteering Championships medalists